2005 Khanaqin bombings were suicide attacks on two Shia mosques in Khanaqin, Iraq (near the Iranian border), on November 18, 2005.

External links 

Iraq suicide attacks kill dozens, BBC News, 18 November 2005

2005 murders in Iraq
21st-century mass murder in Iraq
Attacks in Iraq in 2005
Explosions in 2005
Al-Qaeda activities in Iraq
Violence against Shia Muslims in Iraq
Attacks on Shiite mosques
Suicide car and truck bombings in Iraq
Baghdad
Mass murder in 2005
November 2005 events in Iraq
Khanaqin
Attacks on religious buildings and structures in Iraq
Building bombings in Iraq